The discography of Taiwanese rock band Mayday includes 9 studio albums, 11 live albums, and 3 compilation albums.

Albums

Studio albums

Live albums

Compilation albums

Singles

Japanese singles

Notes

References 

Discography
Discographies of Taiwanese artists
Rock music group discographies
Mandopop discographies